Orthonevra pictipennis (Loew,1863), the Dusky-veined Mucksucker, is an uncommon species of syrphid fly. It has been observed in North America. Hoverflies get their names from the ability to remain nearly motionless while in flight. The adults are also known as flower flies, for they are commonly found around and on flowers from which they get both energy-giving nectar and protein-rich pollen. Larvae for this genus are of the rat-tailed type. O. pictipennis larvae have not been described.

References

Eristalinae
Articles created by Qbugbot
Insects described in 1863
Taxa named by Hermann Loew